Hogan's Romance Upset is a 1915 American short comedy film directed by Charles Avery and featuring both Fatty Arbuckle and Harold Lloyd in uncredited roles as a spectators.

Cast
 Charles Murray as Hogan
 Bobby Dunn as Weary Willie
 Louise Fazenda
 Ben Turpin
 Ted Edwards as Athletic Club Member
 Vivian Edwards
 Billy Gilbert
 Frank Hayes
 Charles Lakin as Athletic Club Member
 Josef Swickard
 Roscoe 'Fatty' Arbuckle as Fight Spectator (uncredited)
 Billie Brockwell as Bit Role (uncredited)
 Charley Chase as Bit Role (uncredited)
 Harold Lloyd as Fight Spectator (uncredited)
 Ford Sterling as Fight Spectator (uncredited)
 Al St. John as Bit Role (uncredited)
 Mack Swain as Fight Spectator (uncredited)

See also
 List of American films of 1915
 Fatty Arbuckle filmography
 Harold Lloyd filmography

References

External links

1915 films
1915 comedy films
1915 short films
American silent short films
American black-and-white films
Films directed by Charles Avery
Silent American comedy films
American comedy short films
1910s American films